Crocomela is a genus of moths in the subfamily Arctiinae. The genus was described by William Forsell Kirby in 1892.

Species
 Crocomela abadesa Dognin, 1900
 Crocomela albolineata Druce, 1911
 Crocomela colorata Walker, 1865
 Crocomela conscita Druce, 1903
 Crocomela erectistria Warren, 1904
 Crocomela flammifera Warren, 1904
 Crocomela fusifera Walker, 1856
 Crocomela imperialis Druce, 1885
 Crocomela inca Schaus, 1892
 Crocomela intensa Walker, 1854
 Crocomela latimargo Dognin, 1912
 Crocomela luxuriosa Hering, 1925
 Crocomela maxima Druce, 1896
 Crocomela regia Warren, 1901
 Crocomela rubriplaga Warren, 1904
 Crocomela tenuifascia Hering, 1925
 Crocomela theophrastus Hering, 1926
 Crocomela tripunctata Druce, 1885
 Crocomela unifasciata Druce, 1885

References

External links

Arctiinae